Pavel Payano is an American politician who is a member of the Massachusetts Senate for the 1st Essex district. Elected in November 2022, he will assume office on January 4, 2023.

Education 
Payano earned a Bachelor of Arts degree in political science from the University of Massachusetts Amherst, a Master of Science in public affairs from the University of Massachusetts Boston, and a Juris Doctor from the Suffolk University Law School.

Career 
In 2006 and 2007, Payano worked as the Massachusetts outreach director for the Democratic National Committee. From 2007 to 2009, he served as a special assistant and immigration specialist for Congresswoman Niki Tsongas. From 2009 to 2011, he served as a benefits eligibility social worker in the Massachusetts Executive Office of Health and Human Services. Payano later worked as a project manager for the University of Massachusetts Lowell and managed Juana Matias's 2016 campaign for the Massachusetts House of Representatives. He was also an adjunct professor at Merrimack College and chaired the Boston chapter of the Association of Latino Professionals For America. Payano served as a member of the Lawrence City Council from 2018 to 2022.

References 

Living people
Democratic Party Massachusetts state senators
University of Massachusetts Amherst alumni
University of Massachusetts Boston alumni
Hispanic and Latino American state legislators in Massachusetts
Suffolk University Law School alumni
People from Lawrence, Massachusetts
Politicians from Lawrence, Massachusetts
Merrimack College faculty
University of Massachusetts Lowell people
Democratic National Committee people
Year of birth missing (living people)